Rustai-ye Abbas Aba (also Romanized as Rūstāī-ye ʿAbbās Ābā) is a village in Koshkuiyeh Rural District, Koshkuiyeh District, Rafsanjan County, Kerman Province, Iran. At the 2006 census, its population was 473, in 110 families.

References 

Populated places in Rafsanjan County